Hetrick is a surname. Notable people with the surname include:

Glenn Hetrick (born 1972), actor and special effects makeup artist/designer from Pennsylvania
Jennifer Hetrick (born 1958), American actress
Robert Hetrick (1769–1849), poet and blacksmith from Dalmellington, Ayrshire, Scotland
W. Brady Hetrick (1907–1999), former Democratic member of the Pennsylvania House of Representatives

See also
Hetrick-Martin Institute, New York City based non-profit organization devoted to LGBTQ youth
HTRK